Guatemalan recording artist Ricardo Arjona has released 15 studio albums, sixteen compilation albums, two live albums, forty-five singles and two promotional singles. Four of his albums have reached the number-one position on the Billboard Top Latin Albums chart, while four of his singles have topped the Billboard Latin Songs chart. Throughout his career, Arjona has sold approximately 20 million albums worldwide, making him one of the most successful Latin artists in music history. Arjona released his debut album, Déjame Decir Que Te Amo, in 1985. However, his experiences while recording the album and its commercial failure led to his decision to abandon the music industry. Despite this decision, Arjona returned and released Jesús, Verbo No Sustantivo in 1988. In 1991, Arjona signed a record deal with Sony Music and released his third studio album, Del Otro Lado del Sol.

His 1992 release, Animal Nocturno, garnered international success and spawned the singles "Mujeres" and "Primera Vez". His album Historias was also commercially successful; two million copies were sold and it received twenty-seven platinum and two diamond certifications. The album produced the hits "Te Conozco" and "Señora De Las Cuatro Decadas". According to Arjona, Animal Nocturno and Historias are the best-selling albums of his career. The singer's albums Si El Norte Fuera El Sur and Sin Daños a Terceros were released in 1996 and 1998, respectively. In December 1998, Arjona recorded his first live album, Vivo, at the Hippodrome in Guatemala City in front of more than 100,000 people; it was later released in 1999. The song "Desnuda" was released as a single, and became his first to top the Billboard Hot Latin Tracks chart.

Galería Caribe, Arjona's eighth album, was released in 2000 and peaked at number-one on the Billboard Top Latin Albums and Latin Pop Albums chart. It contained the hit single "Cuándo", which topped the Billboard Hot Latin Tracks chart. Santo Pecado, released in 2002, became a commercial success and contained the hit singles "El Problema" – which became his third number-one on the Billboard Hot Latin Songs chart –  and "Minutos". In 2005, he released the album Adentro, which sold over one million copies and produced the singles "Pingüinos En La Cama" – which featured  Spanish singer Chenoa, "Mojado" – which featured American Tejano/Norteño band Intocable – and the top-ten hit "Acompañame A Estar Solo".

After spending the majority of his career signed to Sony Music, Arjona signed a long-term record deal with Warner Music Latina in September 2008. Arjona then announced he would release his eleventh studio album, 5to Piso, on 18 November 2008. The album was preceded by the first single, "Como Duele", which was released in September 2008 and reached number two on the Billboard Hot Latin Songs chart and number-one on the Latin Pop Songs chart. The album debuted at number-one on the Billboard Top Latin Albums chart, became Arjona's second number-one on that chart, and has sold more than one million copies worldwide. His album Poquita Ropa followed in 2010, the first single from which, "Puente", is an anthem about the relationship between Cuba and the United States. In 2011, Arjona released his thirteenth studio album, Independiente, the first under his own record label Metamorfosis.

Albums

Studio albums

Compilation albums

Live albums

Singles

Promotional singles

Notes

 In Mexico, both Hung Medien and AMPROFON websites are used to retrieve chart positions.

 In Argentina, from 1991 to 1998, chart positions shown were published in Billboard'''s "Hits of the World" section. From 2000 onwards, chart information shown is provided by CAPIF.
 Chilean chart information was published in Billboard's "Hits of the World" section, which was provided by the courtesy of the Asociacion Fonográfica de Chile (IFPI Chile).
 Trópico charted at No.9 on the US Tropical Albums.
 Originally released in 1989, the chart positions for "Por Qué Es Tan Cruel El Amor" belong to the version included in Solo (2004), and released as a single in 2005 to promote the album.
 Animal Nocturno and Historias US sales figures as of November 1994.
 Historias US sales figures as of January 2011.
 Sin Daños a Terceros sales figures as of August 1998.
 Vivo sales figures as of July 2011.
 Adentro sales figures as of February 2006.
 5to Piso international sales figures as of July 2010 and US sales figures as of July 2011.
 Solo charted at No.4 on the US Top Heatseekers.
 Santo Pecado, Solo and Adentro sales figures as of September 2006.
 Galeria Caribe sales figures as of October 2000.
 Animal Nocturno and Historias Chilean sales figures as of September 1995.
 Historias Argentinian sales figures as of November 1995.
 Galería Caribe worldwide sales figures as of May 2002.

 Independiente US sales figures as of November 2012 and worldwide sales figures as of October 2012.
 Viaje'' US sales figures as of January 2015.

References

Latin pop music discographies
Discography